Mycoleptodonoides tropicalis is a species of tooth fungus in the family Meruliaceae. It was described as new to science in 2013 by mycologists Hai-Sheng Yuan and Yu-Cheng Dai. The type collection was made in the Xishuangbanna Tropical Botanical Garden in Mengla County (Yunnan, China), where the fungus was found fruiting on a decaying angiosperm trunk. The specific epithet tropicalis refers to the tropical forest habitat.

References

Meruliaceae
Fungi described in 2009
Fungi of China
Taxa named by Yu-Cheng Dai